This is a list of bands from the San Francisco Bay Area, music groups founded in the San Francisco Bay Area or closely associated with the region. Individual musicians who formed bands under their own name there are included, but not if they are solo artists. The list is grouped in three sections: San Francisco Peninsula/North Bay, East Bay, and South Bay.

San Francisco Peninsula/North Bay

 The Ace of Cups
 The Action Design
 The Aislers Set
 American Music Club
 Andre Nickatina
 Animosity
 Anvil Chorus
 Automatic Pilot
 Avengers
 Babylon A.D.
 Back in the Saddle
 Beaten by Them
 The Beau Brummels
 The Beatnigs
 Beefy Red   (based in Marin County, 1969–1972)
 Beulah
 Big Brother and the Holding Company
 Blame Sally
 Blaqk Audio
 Black Rebel Motorcycle Club
 Blue Cheer
 Bracket
 Brittany Shane
 The Brian Jonestown Massacre
 Buckethead
 Butch Engle & the Styx
 Cacophony (band)
 The Cat Heads
 The Charlatans
 Chris Isaak
 Chrome
 Chuck Prophet
 Clover
 Con Funk Shun
 Consolidated
 Conspiracy of Beards
 Copperhead
 The Contractions
 Cormorant
 Craig Abaya
 Creedence Clearwater Revival
 Crime
 Crown City Rockers
 The Cubby Creatures
 Dan Hicks and his Hot Licks
 Dan the Automator
 Dave Brubeck Quartet
 Dead Kennedys
 Deafheaven
 Death Angel
 Deerhoof
 Destroy Boys
 Diego's Umbrella
 The Dodos
 The Donnas
 E-40
 The Ebb and Flow
 Eddie and the Tide
 Enemy You
 Every Move A Picture
 Eric Lindell
 Eric McFadden
 Faith No More
 The Family Crest
 Fifty Foot Hose
 Film School
 First Blood
 Flamin' Groovies
 Flipper
 4 Non Blondes<ref
name="autogenerated1988"></ref>
 Geographer
 Girls
 The Gone Jackals
 Graham Central Station
 Grateful Dead
 The Great Society
 H.E.R.
 Her Space Holiday
 Hickey (band)
 Hoodoo Rhythm Devils
 The House Jacks
 Hot Flash Heat Wave
 Hot Tuna
 Huey Lewis and the News
 Imperial Teen
 It's a Beautiful Day
 J Church
 Jay Som
 Jefferson Airplane
 Jefferson Starship
 Jenifer McKitrick
 Jim Campilongo
 Journey
 Kak
 Kaskade
 Karate High School
 Kronos Quartet
 Larry Graham
 Latin Soul Syndicate
 Lee Presson and the Nails
 Leila and the Snakes
 Leon's Creation
 Leviathan (musical project)
 Linda Tillery
 Logos
 Loquat
 LoveLikeFire
 The M Machine
 Mac Dre
 Malo
 Matt Nathanson
 Metallica
 Michael Franti
 Michelle Lambert
 Mink DeVille
 M.I.R.V.
 Moby Grape
 Mojo Men
 Mordred
 Morning Glory
 Mother Earth
 Mommyheads
 Mount Rushmore
 Mr. Bungle
 N2Deep
 Naked Lunch
 Negativland
 New Riders of the Purple Sage
 Night Ranger
 The Nuns
 The Ophelias (California band)
 Osees
 Oxbow
 The Other Half
 Pablo Cruise
 Papa Roach
 Pansy Division
 Pearl Harbor and the Explosions
 Pointer Sisters
 Psychefunkapus
 Quicksilver Messenger Service
 Razor Skyline
 The Residents
 Romeo Void
 Rosin Coven
 Rubicon
 Rupa and the April Fishes
 Sammy Hagar
 Santana
 Sean Hayes
 Secret Chiefs 3
 Seventeen Evergreen
 Sly and the Family Stone
 Snakefinger
 Snake River Conspiracy
 Sons of Champlin
 Sopwith Camel
 The Sorentinos
 Steel Breeze
 Steve Miller Band
 Steve Kimock
 The Stone Foxes
 Sun Kil Moon
 SVT
 Sweet Trip
 Swell
 Switchblade Symphony
 Thao & the Get Down Stay Down
 Thinking Fellers Union Local 282
 Third Eye Blind
 Those Darn Accordions
 Thunderegg
 Time in Malta
 Toiling Midgets
 Tommy Tutone
 Tower of Power
 Train
 Translator
 Tsunami Bomb
 The Tubes
 Tupac Shakur
 Tuxedomoon
 The Union Trade
 The Units
 Until December
 Two Gallants
 Tycho
 Ty Segall
 Vain
 Vejtables
 The Velvet Teen
 Vernian Process
 Vetiver
 Victims Family
 Voice Farm
 Von
 We Five
 Whipping Boy
 Whirr
 Wire Train
 Wooden Shjips
 X-tal
 Young Elders

East Bay

 Adrian Marcel
 AFI
 All Shall Perish
 American Steel
 Attitude
 Attitude Adjustment
 Automatic Man
 Audrye Sessions
 Blackalicious
 Blatz
 Brett Dennen
 Cold Blood
 Communiqué
 Condemned Attitude
 Counting Crows
 Country Joe and the Fish
 The Coup
 The Coverups
 Creedence Clearwater Revival
 Crimpshrine
 Cry Wolf
 Dance Hall Crashers
 The Dandelion War
 Day Wave
 Death Angel
 Defiance
 Deltron 3030
 Digital Underground
 Earth Quake
 En Vogue
 Ensemble Mik Nawooj
 Everyone Is Dirty
 Exodus
 Filth
 Fifteen
 Finish Ticket
 Fleshies
 Forbidden
 The Frustrators
 Foxboro Hot Tubs
 G-Eazy
 Green Day
 Guapdad 4000
 Hazel English
 Heathen
 Hieroglyphics
 High on Fire
 Honeycut
 Hurricane
 Iamsu!
 Idiot Flesh
 Kehlani
 The Jars
 Jason Becker
 Jay Som
 Jellyfish
 Joe Satriani
 Joy of Cooking
 Judgement Day
 Kai
 Lȧȧz Rockit
 Lil B
 Link 80
 The Loading Zone
 The Lonely Island
  The Longshot
 The Lookouts
 The Lovemakers
 Luniz
 Lyrics Born
 Mac Dre
 Machine Head
 Maldroid
 The Matches
 MC Hammer
 Metal Church
 Michael Franti
 Monsula
 Montrose
 The Mother Hips
 The Mr. T Experience
 Negative pH
 The Network
 Neurosis
 New Diplomat
 Operation Ivy
 The Pack
 Papa Wheelie
 The Phenomenauts
 Pinhead Gunpowder
 The Pointer Sisters
 Possessed
 Primus
 Rancid
 Rogue Wave
 The Rubinoos
 Samiam
 Saweetie
 The Savage Resurrection
 Screw 32
 Sentinel
 Set Your Goals
 Shannon and the Clams
 Sheila E
 Souls of Mischief
 Stoneground
 The Story So Far
 Sweet Baby
 SWMRS
 Testament
 Tilt
 Timex Social Club
 Tony! Toni! Toné!
 Too Short
 Toro y Moi
 Tower of Power
 The Uptones
 Vio-lence
 Vitamin Party
 Y&T

South Bay

 Bassnectar
 The Call
 Camper Van Beethoven
 The Chocolate Watchband
 Chris Cain
 Count Five
 Dada
 DJ Shadow
 Dredg
 Drunk Injuns
 The Doobie Brothers
 The Faction
 Lars Frederiksen and the Bastards
 Los Microwaves
 Manmade God
 Monkeyska
 No Use for a Name
 The Limousines
 Lindsey Buckingham
 Los Tigres del Norte
 Pablo Cruise
 Papa Doo Run Run
 Peninsula Banjo Band
 People!
 Sleep
 Smash Mouth
 Stained Glass
 Stevie Nicks
 Strata
 Syndicate of Sound
 Systematic
 Trapt
 Tsunami
 Vienna Teng
 Xiu Xiu

See also

 San Francisco Sound

References

Further reading
 Selvin, Joel. San Francisco: The Musical History Tour. Chronicle Books: 1996.

Culture of San Francisco
San Francisco Bay Area

San Francisco Bay Area-related lists
Lists of bands